Fair Haven was an Amtrak intercity train station in Fair Haven, Vermont. It opened in November 1997, and was closed and replaced by nearby Castleton station in January 2010.

History

The Ethan Allen Express began service between New York City's Penn Station and Rutland on December 2, 1996.  It was the first passenger service on the line between Whitehall and Rutland since 1934. An infill station was opened at Fair Haven on November 12, 1997.

The station building, originally built by the Delaware and Hudson Railway, was in poor condition and was not available for passenger use. Instead, Amtrak passengers used a small bus shelter located across the street from the building.

Fair Haven is a small town with limited tourist activity; in fiscal year 2007 the station served just 2,205 passengers. In January 2010, Fair Haven station was replaced with Castleton station,  to the east, which better serves Castleton University and Lake Bomoseen. Castleton station opened on January 2; Fair Haven remained in use until January 9.

References

External links

Fair Haven Amtrak Station (USA Rail Guide -- Train Web)
Station on Google Maps Street View

Former Amtrak stations in Vermont
Buildings and structures in Fair Haven, Vermont
Railway stations in the United States opened in 1997
Railway stations closed in 2010
Transportation buildings and structures in Rutland County, Vermont
Former Delaware and Hudson Railway stations